The Skye and Wester Ross attacks were a group of shootings and a stabbing which occurred on 10 August 2022 on the Isle of Skye and in Lochalsh (Skye and Lochalsh). The attacks resulted in one person being killed and three injured.

Attacks

Tarskavaig 
At 9:02 a.m. BST, police were initially called to a property in Tarskavaig, Skye, after a report of a 32-year-old woman sustaining critical injuries after being stabbed. She was airlifted to Queen Elizabeth University Hospital in Glasgow.

Teangue 
The police said a firearm had been discharged and a man, aged 47, had died at the scene.

Dornie 
A man and woman, both aged 63, were injured and taken to Raigmore Hospital in Inverness and Broadford Hospital in Skye respectively.

Police said that the incidents were linked and that a 39-year-old man had been arrested, with a taser being discharged during the arrest. He was also taken to Raigmore Hospital. Multiple ambulances, air ambulances, an Emergency Medical Retrieval Service and a special operations response team were involved.

Aftermath 
On 11 August, the man who had been arrested was charged with the murder of one man and the attempted murders of three others. It was confirmed that the 32-year-old woman and 63-year-old man were still in hospital with serious injuries, but that the 63-year-old woman had been released.

On 12 August, a 39-year-old man appeared at Inverness Sheriff Court. He made no plea and was remanded in custody. He faces a murder charge, and two charges of assault to severe injury, danger of life and attempted murder, and a third charge of assault to severe injury, permanent disfigurement and attempted murder. 

His wife was named as the 32-year-old woman who was the first to be attacked. She remains at Queen Elizabeth University Hospital in critical condition, whilst the 63-year-old man remains at Raigmore Hospital in serious condition.

See also 

2020 Reading stabbings
Cumbria shootings
Dunblane massacre
Glasgow hotel stabbings

References 

2022 in Scotland
August 2022 events in the United Kingdom
Attacks in the United Kingdom in 2022
Deaths by firearm in Scotland
Isle of Skye
Ross and Cromarty
Skye and Lochalsh